Bukhara‐ye Sharif was the first Tajik newspaper in Central Asia started on 11 March 1912 in Bukhara. The Emirate of Bukhara with its capital Bukhara and its main city Samarkand had been a Russian protectorate since 1873. In 1920, after a successful attack of the Bolsheviks, it was replaced with the Bukharan People's Soviet Republic.

After the dissolution of the Soviet Union and the subsequent creation of the independent Republic of Tajikistan in 1991, the founding date of the Bukhara‐ye sharif newspaper was officially declared as the Day of the Press in Tajikistan.

See also 
 List of newspapers in Tajikistan

External links 
Баҳси "форсӣ" ва "тоҷикӣ" дар "Бухорои шариф" (Tajik)
Bukharai-ye-sharif (English)

Emirate of Bukhara
Newspapers published in Tajikistan
Mass media in Bukhara
Tajikistani journalism